Dan Clark (born November 3, 1957) is a Canadian retired professional ice hockey player. He played four games in the National Hockey League with the New York Rangers during the 1978–79 season. The rest of his career, which lasted from 1977 to 1986, was spent in the minor leagues.

Career statistics

Regular season and playoffs

External links
 

1957 births
Living people
Canadian ice hockey defencemen
Edmonton Oilers (WHA) draft picks
Hershey Bears players
Ice hockey people from Toronto
Kamloops Chiefs players
Langley Lords players
Maine Mariners players
Milwaukee Admirals (IHL) players
New Haven Nighthawks players
New York Rangers draft picks
New York Rangers players
Philadelphia Flyers draft picks
Springfield Indians players